Daedalea quercina is a species of mushroom in the order Polyporales, and the type species of the genus Daedalea. Commonly known as the oak mazegill or maze-gill fungus, the specific epithet refers to the oak genus Quercus, upon which it frequently grows, causing a brown rot. It is found in Europe, Asia, Northern Africa and Australasia.  Though inedible, it can be used as a natural comb and has been the subject of chemical research.

Description

They are found singly or in tiered groups, usually on rotting oak. The upper surface of the cap may be various shades of brown, and is sometimes zonate. The pore surface, white to tan in color, is initially porous, but as the fruit body matures, some of the pore walls break down, forming slits with blunt partitions. This results in the characteristic maze-like (daedaloid or labyrinthinine/labyrinthiform) appearance. The tube walls are 10–30 mm long, with thick walls. The basidiospores are 5–7 × 2–4 μm, smooth, and elliptical in shape. In deposit the spores are white.

This mushroom is inedible due to its cork-like texture.

A variant has been described that has large, angular pores similar to those in the genus Trametes, named D. quercina forma trametea.

Habitat and distribution

Although D. quercina prefers to grow on Quercus species, it has also been found on the tree species Fagus grandifolia, Fraxinus americana, Juglans nigra, and Ulmus americana.

It has been reported from nearly all European countries, following the pattern of oak distribution. It has also been reported in Northern Africa, North America, (Tunisia), Asia from Caucasus to India, and also Australia.

Uses

Fruit bodies of D. quercina have been used as a natural comb, employed for brushing down horses with tender skin. Gilbertson notes that in England, smoldering fruit bodies were used for anesthetizing bees.

This species has been investigated for application in bioremediation. The lignin-degrading enzyme laccase, isolated and purified from D. quercina, has shown use in biodegrading a variety of toxic dyes and pigments.

The compound quercinol (a chromene derivative), isolated from the oak mazegill, has anti-inflammatory activity, and inhibits the enzymes cyclooxygenase 2, xanthine oxidase, and horseradish peroxidase.

References

External links
Mushroom Expert
Index Fungorum Synonyms
Photos of the oak mazegill
Botany Photo of the Day

Fomitopsidaceae
Fungi described in 1753
Taxa named by Carl Linnaeus
Fungi of Africa
Fungi of Asia
Fungi of Australia
Fungi of Europe
Inedible fungi